The Jail Hill Historic District encompasses a 19th-century working-class residential district in Norwich, Connecticut.  Located on a steep hill overlooking downtown Norwich, it was populated first by African Americans, and then by Irish immigrants.  Some early African-American residents played significant roles in bringing expanded rights and education to others. The district was added to the National Register of Historic Places on April 19, 1999.

Description and history
Jail Hill takes its name from a jail built in 1834, which stood between Fountain and Cedar Streets, overlooking the city's downtown area. The district includes all or part of School, John, Fountain, Cedar, Happy, and Old Division Streets. It encompasses a working-class residential area whose development began in the 1830s and was largely complete by 1865. Houses are of modest size and scale, and are typically vernacular interpretations of Greek Revival and Italianate styling, although later styles such as Queen Anne are also present.

Unlike many other early cities, Norwich's wealthy did not build on the highest ground above its developing downtown core.  The Jail Hill area consequently became one where marginalized elements of society settled instead.  The earliest settlers were free people of color from the Williams and Harris families, who purchased land here beginning in the 1830s.  The Harrises were notably involved in the controversy surrounding the Prudence Crandall School in Canterbury: a Harris daughter was enrolled in the Crandall school, which was at the time otherwise exclusively white, and it was local community resistance to this enrollment that prompted Crandall to establish a school for African-American girls.  The Harrises and Williamses were also active in abolitionist movements, and some of them went south after the American Civil War to establish schools for the education of emancipated slaves.

In the 1850s, the area gradually transformed into one dominated by Irish immigrants, many of whom were fleeing the Great Famine.  They sought work in Norwich's textile mills, positions which were generally denied to the African Americans.  The area was able to maintain a cohesive and tightly knit neighborhood due in part to the limitations of the geography.

Gallery

See also
Neighborhoods of Norwich, Connecticut
National Register of Historic Places listings in New London County, Connecticut

References

Historic districts in New London County, Connecticut
Norwich, Connecticut
National Register of Historic Places in New London County, Connecticut
Historic districts on the National Register of Historic Places in Connecticut